Osmundea hybrida is a fairly small marine red alga.

Description
Osmundea hybrida is  small branched alga which grows from a holdfast to 15 mm long. The axes show a main axis with branches which may be spiral or irregular. The main axis may be slightly compressed with a medulla of cells surrounded by a cortex deep purplish-brown in colour. A small circular pit occurs at the apex of the branches.

Habitat
Common but not as common as Osmundea pinnatifida. Epilithic in the littoral on stones, rock and on limpets.

Reproduction
Spermatangial receptacles, where the male gametes occur in small cups, are at the end of the side branches. Cystocarps are spherical and sessile and tetraspores are produced in small branchlets.

Distribution
This alga is to be found all around the British Isles as far north as Shetland. Further south it is recorded to Portugal.

References

Rhodomelaceae